Acaraú (also Acarahú) is a municipality in the Ceará state of Brazil. The city lies on the Acaraú River near the northern Atlantic coast. In 2020 the population was estimated at 63,104. The municipality is a major producer of Brazilian lobster and its economy depends heavily on fishing, agriculture and cattle breeding.

Historically, Acaraú was known as Acaracu until 19 September 1882.

References

Populated coastal places in Ceará
Municipalities in Ceará